The Great Lakes Summer Collegiate League (GLSCL) is a collegiate summer baseball league in the Great Lakes region of the United States. It is affiliated with the National Alliance of College Summer Baseball and comprises teams with college baseball players from around North America. The league is sanctioned and supported by Major League Baseball. Players are not paid so as to maintain their NCAA eligibility, and the league follows NCAA rules. Many of the teams play in baseball stadiums that are normally occupied by college teams.

The Great Lakes Summer Collegiate League uses wooden bats to prepare collegiate players for the transition to professional baseball.

Teams

Notable GLSCL alumni

 Chad Cordero
 Shane Costa
 David Dellucci
 Dustin Hermanson
 Ryan Rua
 Quinton McCracken
 Paul Quantrill
 Scott Sauerbeck
 Jonathan Sánchez
 Nick Swisher
 Jay Jackson
 Brian Bixler
 Josh Harrison
 Adam Russell
 Cory Luebke
 John Van Benschoten
 Brad Hennessey
 Eric Wedge
 Dayton Moore
 Matt Mieske
 Dan Masteller
 A.J. Sager
 Tom Marsh
 Blaine Crim
 Scott Effross

References

Further reading

External links
GLSCL Official Website

Summer baseball leagues
College baseball leagues in the United States
Baseball leagues in Ohio
Baseball leagues in Michigan
1986 establishments in the United States
Sports leagues established in 1986